The discography of You Me at Six, an English rock band, consists of seven studio albums, one live album, four extended plays, forty-three singles and thirty-two music videos.

Albums

Studio albums

Live albums

Extended plays

Singles

Other charted songs

Other appearances

Music videos

References

Discographies of British artists
Pop punk group discographies